The 2013–14 season was Associazione Sportiva Roma's 86th in existence and 85th season in the top flight of Italian football. The pre-season started with the June hiring of Lille OSC manager Rudi Garcia. Garcia replaced caretaker manager Aurelio Andreazzoli who took charge after the sacking of Zdeněk Zeman in February 2013. Andreazzoli's reign had seen the continuation of a disappointing season, with the team ending up in 6th place in Serie A, whilst also losing 1–0 to regional rivals Lazio in the Coppa Italia final. As a result, Roma missed out on European competition for the second season in a row. The 2013–14 season, in contrast, saw one of Roma's best ever in Serie A, the club tallying an impressive 85 points and finishing second to Juventus, who won the league with a record-breaking 102 points. Roma's defense was significantly better than in previous seasons, with only 25 goals conceded and a total of 21 clean sheets, including nine in their first ten matches.

Players

Squad information
Last updated on 18 May 2014
Appearances include league matches only

Transfers

In

Loans in

Total spending:  €76,290,000

Out

Co-ownerships out

Loans out

Total income:  €117,610,000
Net income:  €40,120,000

Pre-season and friendlies

Competitions

Overall

Last updated: 18 May 2014

Serie A

League table

Results summary

Results by round

Matches

Coppa Italia

Statistics

Appearances and goals

|-
! colspan=10 style="background:#B21B1C; color:#FFD700; text-align:center"| Goalkeepers

|-
! colspan=10 style="background:#B21B1C; color:#FFD700; text-align:center"| Defenders

|-
! colspan=10 style="background:#B21B1C; color:#FFD700; text-align:center"| Midfielders

|-
! colspan=10 style="background:#B21B1C; color:#FFD700; text-align:center"| Forwards

|-
! colspan=10 style="background:#B21B1C; color:#FFD700; text-align:center"| Players transferred out during the season

Goalscorers

Last updated: 18 May 2014

Clean sheets

Last updated: 18 May 2014

Disciplinary record

Last updated: 18 May 2014

References

A.S. Roma seasons
Roma